Curlsask (stylized CURLSASK), formerly known as the Saskatchewan Curling Association, is the regional governing body for the sport of curling in Saskatchewan.  It was founded in 1904.

The association has more than 130 member curling clubs organized into 8 regions: Southwest, Southeast, West Central, East Central, Northeast, Northwest, Regina, and Saskatoon.

Provincial championships 
CURLSASK hosts nine provincial championships annually:

 SaskTel Tankard (Men's)
 Viterra Scotties Tournament of Hearts (Women's)
 Mixed
 Mixed Doubles
 Juniors
 U18
 Seniors
 Masters
 Club

See also 

 List of curling clubs in Saskatchewan

References

External links 

 Official Site

Curling governing bodies in Canada
Curling in Saskatchewan
Sports governing bodies in Saskatchewan